Stigmata is a 1999 supernatural horror film directed by Rupert Wainwright and distributed by Metro-Goldwyn-Mayer. It was written by Tom Lazarus and Rick Ramage. Its story follows an atheist hairdresser from Pittsburgh, Pennsylvania, who is afflicted with stigmata after acquiring a rosary formerly owned by a deceased Italian priest who himself had suffered from the phenomenon. It stars Patricia Arquette, Gabriel Byrne, Jonathan Pryce, Nia Long, and Rade Šerbedžija.

The film was produced by FGM Entertainment and was released on September 10, 1999. It grossed $18.3 million during its opening weekend and $89.4 million worldwide, against a budget of $29 million. It received generally negative reviews and has a 22% approval rating on Rotten Tomatoes. Despite its negative reviews, Stigmata more than tripled its budget.

Plot
In the Brazilian village of Belo Quinto, Father Andrew Kiernan, a former scientist and a Jesuit priest who investigates supposed miracles, examines a statue of the Virgin Mary weeping blood at the funeral of Father Paulo Alameida, who had previously experienced stigmata. While Andrew is collecting evidence, a young boy steals a rosary from the father's hand. The boy later sells it to a woman in a marketplace, who sends it to her daughter, Frankie Paige, living in Pittsburgh.

Shortly afterward, Frankie is attacked by an unseen force while bathing, and receives two deep wounds on her wrists. As the wounds are treated, doctors cannot find the cause. Frankie asks a priest if he is Andrew Kiernan, the scientist, priest and investigator. When the priest says he is Father Derning, the lights in the train flash and Frankie is whipped from behind by an unseen force. While Frankie is hospitalized again, the priest sends security tapes showing the attack to the Vatican, and Andrew is sent to investigate.

Andrew interviews Frankie, believing her wounds may also be stigmata. When she tells him she is an atheist, Andrew tells her that stigmata is when the deeply devoted are struck with the five wounds that Jesus received during the crucifixion. Frankie begins to research on her own what the cause could be. Her head begins to bleed, the third stigmata wound caused by the Crown of Thorns. Frankie runs home, where Andrew is waiting, and then runs into an alley. As Andrew pursues her, Frankie smashes a glass bottle and uses the shards to carve symbols on the hood of a car: when Andrew approaches her, she yells at him in another language.

Andrew takes Frankie to Father Derning's church, and the Vatican translates what she was yelling in Aramaic. The next morning, Andrew returns to her apartment to find her writing on the wall, now covered in Aramaic. Frankie talks in a male voice, speaking Italian. Wounds appear in her feet, the fourth wound of stigmata. Andrew emails photographs of Frankie's apartment wall to the Vatican, where Brother Delmonico recognizes the words and deletes the pictures. He tells Andrew the words are from a document the church found that looked to be an entirely new gospel. Father Dario shows the pictures to Cardinal Daniel Houseman, who also recognizes them. Delmonico phones Marion Petrocelli and tells him the missing gospel has been found in Pittsburgh.

Andrew goes to Frankie's apartment to find the wall she wrote on painted over, and Frankie attempts to seduce him. When Andrew rejects her, she attacks him and denounces his beliefs in a male voice, ending with Frankie levitating off the bed, crying tears of blood. Houseman and Dario arrive with Derning and take Frankie to another church, sending Andrew to Derning's. At Derning's church, Andrew meets Petrocelli, who tells him the words Frankie has been writing are part of a document found outside Jerusalem they believed to be a gospel in the exact words of Jesus. Petrocelli, Delmonico and Alameida were assigned to translate it, but Houseman ordered them to stop. Alameida refused and stole the document to continue translating it alone, having been excommunicated by Houseman.

Petrocelli tells Andrew that the document was Jesus telling his disciples that the Kingdom of God is in all of us and not confined to churches. Petrocelli tells Andrew that Alameida suffered from stigmata. Andrew races to the church where Frankie is, while Houseman and Dario attempt to perform an exorcism on Frankie. Frankie shouts at them in a male voice, and Houseman attempts to strangle her. Andrew stops him, and the room is set on fire. Now believing Frankie is possessed by Alameida's spirit, Andrew offers to be Alameida's messenger instead. He walks unharmed through the fire to retrieve Frankie, bidding Alameida's spirit to depart in peace. Some time later, Andrew returns to Belo Quinto and finds the original documents for the lost gospel in Alameida's church.

Text just before the end credits describes the discovery of the Gospel of Thomas, stating that the Catholic Church refuses to recognize the document as a gospel and considers it heresy.

Cast

 Patricia Arquette as Frankie Paige
 Gabriel Byrne as Father Andrew Kiernan
 Jonathan Pryce as Cardinal Daniel Houseman
 Nia Long as Donna Chadway
 Rade Šerbedžija as Marion Petrocelli
 Enrico Colantoni as Father Dario
 Jack Donner as Father Paulo Alameida
 Thomas Kopache as Father Durning
 Dick Latessa as Father Gianni Delmonico
 Portia de Rossi as Jennifer Kelliho
 Patrick Muldoon as Steven
 Ann Cusack as Dr. Reston

Production
An international co-production film between The United States and Mexico. Development was first announced in January 1998, when Frank Mancuso Jr. announced his intention to produce a supernatural thriller helmed by Rupert Wainwright

Reception

Box office
Stigmata, produced on a $29 million budget, premièred at the box office in the number one position, earning $18.3 million in its first weekend, becoming the first film in five weekends to outgross The Sixth Sense at the box office. In the United States, Stigmata earned $50,046,268. Internationally the film earned $39,400,000 for a total worldwide gross $89,446,268.

Critical response

The film received poor reviews. The review aggregator website Rotten Tomatoes gives the film a score of 22% approval rating, based on 91 reviews (20 positive, 71 negative). The website's consensus reads, "The story is unconvincing and the acting is weak."

Roger Ebert called it "possibly the funniest movie ever made about Catholicism — from a theological point of view." Gabriel Byrne was nominated for a Razzie Award for Worst Supporting Actor for his performances in both this film and End of Days, where he lost to Ahmed Best as Jar Jar Binks in Star Wars: Episode I – The Phantom Menace.

Release 
Scream Factory released the film on May 19, 2015 for the first time on Blu-ray.

References

External links
 
 
 
 

1999 films
1999 horror films
1990s psychological thriller films
American supernatural horror films
American psychological horror films
American horror thriller films
Mexican horror films
Mexican supernatural horror films
Mexican horror thriller films
Aramaic-language films
Films scored by Billy Corgan
Films about exorcism
Films about religion
Films critical of the Catholic Church
Films directed by Rupert Wainwright
Films scored by Elia Cmíral
Films set in Brazil
Films set in Pittsburgh
Religious horror films
Metro-Goldwyn-Mayer films
1990s English-language films
1990s American films
1990s Mexican films